Adam Schenk (born January 26, 1992) is an American professional golfer.

Schenk was born in Vincennes, Indiana. He played college golf at Purdue University where he won twice as a freshman.

Schenk turned professional in 2015 and played on the PGA Tour Latinoamérica that year. He had six top-10 finishes with a best finish of fourth at the Abierto Mexicano de Golf and the Honduras Open. In 2016, he played on the Web.com Tour with a best finish of second at the United Leasing & Finance Championship. He played on the Web.com Tour again in 2017, winning the Lincoln Land Charity Championship in June in a four-man playoff. He earned his PGA Tour card for 2018 by finishing 12th on the regular season money list.

On the PGA Tour in 2018, Schenk earned one top-10 finish, at the Zurich Classic of New Orleans, a team event he played with Tyler Duncan. He finished 157th on the FedEx Cup standings and had to play in the Web.com Tour Finals to try to regain his card for 2019. In the Finals, he posted three top-10 finishes in four events, including second place at the Albertsons Boise Open to finish seventh in the Finals rankings and earn his 2019 PGA Tour card. On the PGA Tour in 2019, he posted three top-10 finishes and finished 71st on the FedEx Cup standings to retain his card for 2020.

Schenk held his first ever career 54-hole lead on the PGA Tour in October 2021 at the Shriners Children's Open by a single stroke. He could only manage a one-under final round though resulting in a T3 finish, which was his best ever finish on tour to date.  Schenk had a second 54 hole lead at the 2023 Valspar Championship leading Speith and Fleetwood by one stroke at Innisbrook's Copperhead Course in Palm Harbour, Florida.

Amateur wins (3)
2010 Purdue/Midwest Shootout
2011 Boilermaker Invitational
2013 Indiana Amateur

Source:

Professional wins (2)

Web.com Tour wins (1)

Web.com Tour playoff record (1–0)

Other wins (1)
2015 Iowa Open

Results in major championships

"T" = tied

Results in The Players Championship

CUT = missed the halfway cut

See also
2017 Web.com Tour Finals graduates
2018 Web.com Tour Finals graduates

References

External links
 
 

American male golfers
Purdue Boilermakers men's golfers
PGA Tour Latinoamérica golfers
PGA Tour golfers
Golfers from Indiana
People from Vincennes, Indiana
1992 births
Living people